Fallen Jerusalem is an uninhabited island of the British Virgin Islands in the Caribbean, located to the south of Virgin Gorda.  It obtained its name from the large number of oversized volcanic boulders that are scattered over the island (some of which weigh thousands of tons) which give it the vague resemblance of a destroyed city.  It was declared a wildlife sanctuary in 1959.

The island provides habitat for the crested anole (Anolis cristatellus wileyae).

References

Uninhabited islands of the British Virgin Islands
Wildlife sanctuaries of North America